Francesco Muttoni (January 22, 1669 – February 21, 1747) was an Italian architect, engineer, and architectural writer, mainly active near Vicenza, Italy.

Biography
He was born in Lacima, near Porlezza, on Lake Lugano, but his family moved to Vicenza in 1696, where his father worked as a bricklayer.

In Vicenza, he was a pupil of Giovanni Battista Albanese, who in turn had trained with Vincenzo Scamozzi. He was prolific. Among his works, mainly in Vicenza were the following :

Palazzo della pubblica biblioteca
Palazzo Repeta in piazza San Lorenzo (now Bank of Italy)
Palazzo dei Velo in contrà Lodi
Palazzo dei Valmarana a S. Faustino e in Borgo Berga
Porticoes leading to the Basilica di Santa Maria di Monte Berico
Palazzo di Monte di Pieta, Vicenza (facade)
Villa Fracanzan Piovene  Orgiano (1710)
Villa Da Porta La Favorita at Brendola (1714-1715)
Villa Valmarana Morosini ad Altavilla Vicentina  (1724)
Palazzo Trento-Valmarana (1717)
Capella Thiene in the church of Santa Corona, Vicenza (1725)
Villa Valmarana ai Nani
Villa Loschi Zileri dal Verme 
Villa Monza (1715) a Dueville
Villa Checcozzi (1717) a San Tomio di Malo
Villa Trento (1717–18) di Costozza
Villa Cerchiari (1722)  Isola Vicentina
Villa Capra (1728) a Santa Maria di Camisano
Villa Negri (1708)
Gardens of Villa Trissino at Trissino

He is also known for his edition of the Architecture text of Antonio Palladio. He was known to correspond closely with Lord Burlington, who build Chiswick Hall.

He died in Vicenza.

References

1548 births
1616 deaths
Architects from Vicenza
16th-century Italian architects
Italian architecture writers